The women's marathon 10 kilometres competition of the swimming events at the 2011 Pan American Games took place on the 22 of October at the API Maritime Terminal in Puerto Vallarta. The defending Pan American Games champion was Chloe Sutton of the United States.

Schedule
All times are Central Standard Time (UTC-6).

Results
16 competitors from 10 countries are scheduled to compete.

References

External links
Schedule

Swimming at the 2011 Pan American Games
Pan American Games
2011 in women's swimming